Edmund Luciano Christofoli (born January 2, 1939) was a Canadian ice hockey player with the Trail Smoke Eaters. He won a gold medal at the 1961 World Ice Hockey Championships in Switzerland.

References

1939 births
Living people
Canadian ice hockey defencemen
Sportspeople from Trail, British Columbia
Ice hockey people from British Columbia